Skokomish can refer to:

People
Skokomish people, an indigenous people of the Pacific Northwest Coast
Skokomish Indian Tribe, a federally recognized tribe of the Skokomish people
Sko-ko-mish is an archaic rendering of Sḵwxwú7mesh, the indigenous name of the Squamish people of British Columbia.

Places
Lake Skokomish was a Proglacial lake in Washington state.
Skokomish, Washington, a census-designated place in Mason County, Washington
Skokomish Indian Reservation in Mason County, Washington
Skokomish River
Mount Skokomish

Other
Skokomish language, a dialect of the Twana language